Antun Mile Grdic (born 23 May 1975) is an Australian former soccer player who is last known to have played as a defender for Kapfenberger SV.

Career

In 1993, Grdic signed for Croatian side Šibenik after playing for Wollongong United in the Australian lower leagues.

In 1999, he signed for Hajduk, one of Croatia's most successful clubs.

Before the 2001 season, Grdic signed for Zhejiang Greentown in the Chinese second division, where he rejected offers from the Chinese top flight.

In 2006, he signed for Kapfenberger SV in the Austrian second division.

References

External links
 

Australian soccer players
Living people
Expatriate footballers in Austria
Australian expatriate sportspeople in China
Australian expatriate soccer players
Australian people of Croatian descent
Association football defenders
China League One players
Croatian Football League players
Zhejiang Professional F.C. players
1975 births
Kapfenberger SV players
2. Liga (Austria) players
HNK Hajduk Split players
HNK Šibenik players
NK Istra 1961 players
Soccer players from Brisbane
Australian expatriate sportspeople in Austria
Expatriate footballers in Croatia
Expatriate footballers in China
Wollongong United FC players